is a dam in Uonuma, Niigata Prefecture, Japan. The dam was built between 1973 and 1986. It is a 93.5 m concrete gravity dam, for the purpose of hydroelectric power and flood irrigation control in Niigata Prefecture. The water freezes over during the winter months, affecting supply.

References

Dams in Niigata Prefecture
Dams completed in 1986